La Caldera is a small town and municipality in Salta Province in northwestern Argentina. It is located 25 km north of the city of Salta.

References

Populated places in Salta Province